Smartavia, formerly known as Nordavia (until March 2019), is a Russian low-cost airline with its head office in Arkhangelsk, Russia. It mainly operates scheduled domestic and regional services. Its main bases are Arkhangelsk Airport, Pulkovo Airport (Saint Petersburg), and Moscow Domodedovo Airport. Smartavia is a joint-stock company.

History 

The airline was formed in 1963 as Arkhangelsk United Aviation Squadron and became AVL Arkhangelsk Airlines in 1991.

Under Aeroflot
In August 2004 Aeroflot acquired 51% of the airline, with the rest being held by Aviainvest. The company was renamed Aeroflot-Nord, becoming Aeroflot's second regional airline.

Since the contract with Aeroflot ended on 1 December 2009, the airline has operated independently as Nordavia. Because of the bad press the subsidiary received following the Aeroflot Flight 821 disaster, and Russian aviation officials' 15 July 2009 imposition of restrictions (including a ban on international charter tours) on then Aeroflot-Nord flight operations due to insufficient security and bad finances, Aeroflot has distanced itself from Nordavia.

Partnership with NordStar
In March 2011, Aeroflot sold the airline to Norilsk Nickel for a reported US$7 million. On December 1, 2011, Norilsk Nickel reported that Nordavia is to be merged in Taimyr Air Company. However, the Federal Antimonopoly Service blocked the merge of Nordavia with Taimyr Air Company, and Nordavia was ultimately sold to Sergey Kuznetsov, the owner of Red Wings Airlines, in March 2016.

Partnership with Red Wings Airlines
To increase business power, Red Wings Airlines and Nordavia decided to merge. In April 2017, under Red Wings' ownership, it was announced that the airline would change its name to SmartAvia from Q3 2017. In addition to the new brand, the airline planned to also introduce a new livery, still in Nordavia's colors (blue, orange, gray) but with a design that moves away from its Aeroflot ancestry. The new branding was planned to debut on the airline's Airbus A320-200 aircraft, however these aircraft were instead delivered to Red Wings after the airline decided to continue using its Boeing 737 aircraft, accepting its first Boeing 737-700 in May 2018, by then still retaining its Nordavia name and brand identity.

Restructuring to Smartavia
On 20 March 2019, it was announced that the merging of Nordavia with Red Wings airlines was canceled. Instead, the airline is renamed to Smartavia, as part of re-branding. The airline will operate the aircraft under Nordavia brand until the end of 2019. The first aircraft with Smartavia livery arrived in April 2019.

By 2021, the airline retired all of its Boeing 737-500 and in April 2021, the airline began their replacement with new Airbus A320neo, officially announcing the end of two-year re-branding from Nordavia to Smartavia and becoming a low-cost carrier.

On 28 May 2021, during a press-conference held in Kaliningrad, with presenting new Airbus A320neo, previously used by Mexican carrier Interjet, the airline announced the massive order expansion by 40 new Airbus aircraft and plans to phase out all Boeing 737 aircraft by 2023 and since then to operate only Airbus aircraft. In case of plan success, the airline will purchase Airbus A321neo by 2024.

On 16 September 2021, the airline announced its base expansion plans: by Spring 2022, the airline plans to open its new hub at Moscow-Sheremetyevo, as well as to open bases in Kaliningrad, Murmansk, Samara and Sochi.

Destinations

Codeshare agreements
Smartavia Airlines has codeshare agreements with the following airlines:

 Red Wings Airlines

Fleet 

, the Smartavia fleet consists of the following aircraft:

Historical fleet 

Smartavia has previously operated the following aircraft:

Accidents and incidents 

 On 14 September 2008, Aeroflot Flight 821, flown under a combined service agreement with Aeroflot, crashed on approach to Perm Airport, Russia. All 88 people on board, including six crew members, were killed.

References

External links 

  

Former Aeroflot divisions
Airlines established in 1963
1963 establishments in the Soviet Union
Airlines of Russia
Airlines banned in the European Union
Aviation in Arkhangelsk Oblast
Companies based in Arkhangelsk
European Regions Airline Association
Low-cost carriers